Becky or Beckie is a feminine given name, often a short form (hypocorism) of Rebecca. It may refer to:

People
 Rebecca Allison (born 1946), American cardiologist and transgender activist
 Rebecca Becky Anderson (born 1967), British journalist and news anchor
 Becky Ann Baker (born 1953), American actress
 Rebecca Becky Bell (1971–1988), American teenager who died as the result of an abortion
 Rebecca Becky Carney (born 1944), American politician
 Rebecca Becky Downie (born 1992), British artistic gymnast
 Rebecca Becky Easton (born 1974), English footballer
 Rebecca Becky Edelsohn (1892–1973), American anarchist and hunger striker
 Becky Edwards (disambiguation)
 Rebecca Foon (born 1978), Canadian cellist, vocalist and composer
 Rebecca Becky Hill (born 1994), English singer and songwriter
 Becky Hobbs (born 1950), American country singer, songwriter and pianist
 Becky Lee (born 1978), Hong Kong actress and host
 Beckie Middleton (born 1986), English international field hockey player
 Rebecca Quick (born 1972), American television journalist, newscaster and co-anchor
 Rebecca "Becky" Rosso (born 1994), British actress and singer
 Becky Sandstedt, American filmmaker and animal welfare activist
 Rebecca Becky Sauerbrunn (born 1985), American soccer player
 Rebecca Beckie Scott (born 1974), Canadian former cross-country skier
 Rebecca Becky Skillman (born 1950), American politician
 Rebecca "Becky" Watts (1998–2015), British teenage murder victim
 Becky Worley (born 1971), American journalist and broadcaster
 Becky Yee (born 1969), American portrait photographer
 Becky (television personality), Japanese celebrity
 Becky G, stage name of American singer Rebbeca Marie Gomez (born 1997)
 Becky Lynch, ring name of Irish professional wrestler and actress Rebecca Quin (born 30 January 1987)

Fictional characters
 Aunt Becky, the supporting character in the ABC sitcom Full House
 Becky Bloomwood, the main protagonist of the Shopaholic series of novels by Sophie Kinsella
 Becky Farrah, a supporting character from the manga and anime series Gunsmith Cats
 Rebecca "Becky" McDonald, in the British soap opera Coronation Street
 Rebecca "Becky" Sharp, the main character of William Makepeace Thackeray's satirical novel Vanity Fair
 Rebecca "Becky" Sharpe, alter ego of the DC Comics character Hazard
 Becky Thatcher, in Mark Twain's novel The Adventures of Tom Sawyer
 A titular character of Becky and Barnaby Bear, a British children's television series
 Rebecca "Becky" Bunch, the protagonist of the CW musical comedy Crazy Ex-Girlfriend
 Becky Botsford, the female lead in the PBS animated series WordGirl
 Rebecca "Becky" Miyamoto, the protagonist of the manga and anime series Pani Poni
 Becky Blackbell, a character of the manga and anime series Spy × Family
 Becky Cruz, a character from the film The Cookout
 Becky Shorter, a character from the TV sitcom The Simpsons
 Becky Rosen, a character from the TV series Supernatural

See also
 Becki (disambiguation)
 Rebecca (disambiguation)

English feminine given names
English-language feminine given names
Hypocorisms